T-box transcription factor TBX5, (T-box protein 5) is a protein that in humans is encoded by the TBX5 gene.

This gene is a member of a phylogenetically conserved family of genes that share a common DNA-binding domain, the T-box. T-box genes encode transcription factors involved in the regulation of developmental processes.  This gene is closely linked to related family member T-box 3 (ulnar mammary syndrome) on human chromosome 12.

TBX5 is located on the long arm of chromosome 12. TBX5 produces a protein called T-box protein 5 that acts as a transcription factor. TBX5 is involved with forelimb and heart development. This gene impacts the early development of the forelimb by triggering fibroblast growth factor, FGF10.

Function 

TBX5 is involved with the development of the four heart chambers, the electrical conducting system, and the septum separating the right and left sides of the heart. TBX5 is a transcription factor that codes for the protein called T-box 5. Along with playing roles in the development of the heart, septum, and electrical system of the heart, it also activates genes that are involved in the development of the upper limbs, the arms and hands. This gene is involved in patterning major aspects of the heart; however, it is also involved in the muscle connective tissue for muscle and tendon patterning. A study showed that deletion of TBX5 in forelimbs causes disruption in the muscle and tendon patterning without affecting the skeletons development. T-box protein 5 expression is in the cells of the lateral plate mesoderm which form the forelimb bud and the cascade of limb initiation. In its absence no forelimb bud forms. Diseases and defects associated with this gene include Holt–Oram syndrome, and are associated with limb defects and several other abnormalities. The cardiac defects include defects in the septum dividing the left and right sides of the heart, conduction system abnormalities, and other problems. The exact mechanism that Tbx5 activates gene expression is still being discovered and is actively being understood.

Clinical significance 

The encoded protein may play a role in heart development and specification of limb identity. Mutations in this gene have been associated with Holt–Oram syndrome, a developmental disorder affecting the heart and upper limbs. Skeletally there may be abnormally bent fingers, sloping shoulders, and phocomelia. Cardiac defects include ventral and atrial septation and problems with the conduction system. Several transcript variants encoding different isoforms have been described for this gene.

In studies done in mutant mice without the TBX5 gene it has been shown that the homozygous mice did not survive gestation due to the heart not developing past embryonic day E9.5. Also the heterozygous mice were born with morphological problems such as enlarged hearts, atrial and ventral septum defects, and limb malformations similar to those found in the Holt-Oram Syndrome. Supporting the essential role of TBX5 in the heart development.

The encoded protein plays a major role in limb development, specifically during limb bud initiation. For instance, in chickens Tbx5 specifies forelimb status. The activation of Tbx5 and other T-box proteins by Hox genes activates signaling cascades that involve the Wnt signaling pathway and FGF signals in limb buds. Ultimately, Tbx5 leads to the development of apical ectodermal ridge (AER) and zone of polarizing activity (ZPA) signaling centers in the developing limb bud, which specify the orientation growth of the developing limb. Together with Tbx4, Tbx5 plays a role in patterning the soft tissues (muscles and tendons) of the musculoskeletal system.

A mutation in this gene can cause Holt–Oram syndrome or Amelia syndrome. Holt-Oram syndrome can cause several different defects. One effect of Holt-Oram syndrome is a hole in the septum. Another symptom of this syndrome is bone abnormalities in the fingers, wrists, or arms. An additional defect that Holt-Oram syndrome can cause is a conduction disease leading to abnormal heart rates and arrhythmias. Amelia syndrome is a condition where forelimb malformation occurs because FGF-10 is not triggered due to Tbx5 mutations. This condition can lead to the absence of one or both forelimbs.

Interactions 

TBX5 (gene) has been shown to interact with:
 GATA4  and
 NKX2-5.

Role in embryonic development

As a protein-coding gene, TBX5 encodes for the protein T-box Transcription Factor 5, which is a part of the T-box family of transcription factors. It also interacts with other genes, such as GATA4 and NKX2-5, and the BAF chromatin-remodeling complex to drive and repress gene expression during development. The transcription factors it encodes are necessary for development, especially in the pattern formation of upper limbs and cardiac growth.  Whenever there are mutations in this gene, it can result in Holt-Oram Syndrome, which is characterized by skeletal problems of the upper limbs and cardiac issues. The most common cardiac issue associated with this condition is the malformation of the septum, which separates the left and right sides of the heart. A gene "knockout" model for TBX5 by CRISPR/Cas9 genome editing has been created.  This homozygous TBX5 knockout human embryonic stem cell line, called TBX5-KO maintained stem cell-like morphology, pluripotency markers, normal karyotype, and could differentiate into all three germ layers in vivo. This cell line can provide an in vitro platform for studying the pathogenic mechanisms and biological function of TBX5 in the heart development.  By understanding what happens in development without this gene, further treatment options for fetuses with a TBX5 mutation might be possible to prevent the severe cardiac defects associated with Holt-Oram Syndrome.

References

Further reading

External links 
 GeneReviews/NCBI/NIH/UW entry on Holt-Oram Syndrome
 

Transcription factors